Anasa armigera, the horned squash bug, is a species of leaf-footed bug in the family Coreidae. It is found in North America.

References

Articles created by Qbugbot
Insects described in 1825
Coreini